Jack Wayne Reeves (born June 20, 1940) is currently serving a ninety-nine year prison sentence for murdering his second and fourth wives.

Early life 
Reeves was born in Wichita Falls, Texas on June 20, 1940. He retired from the Army in 1985.

First wife 
Reeves' first marriage was at 18 to a 15-year-old. The marriage was annulled in 1960.

Manslaughter 
Reeves married Sharon Vaughn in 1961. In 1967, while stationed with his wife in Italy, Reeves killed a man and served four months in prison for manslaughter. After his release, the couple returned to the United States and settled in Copperas Cove, Texas.

Second wife 
Reeves was married to his second wife Sharon Vaughn for 18 years. They had two sons, Ricky and Randall, while in Italy. In 1977, Sharon pursued an extramarital relationship with John Behneman. She filed for divorce in February 1978 while Reeves was stationed in South Korea. On July 20, 1978, a week after divorcing Reeves, she died of a shotgun wound to her chest that was originally believed to be self-inflicted. The case was re-examined in 1994 and it was determined that she had been murdered. The prosecution demonstrated in court how difficult it would have been for her to shoot herself. A blood spatter expert concluded that Sharon had been wearing a bra and underwear at the time of her death, but when her body was found, she was completely naked. She was 34.

Third wife 
Reeves married Myeong-Hi Chong on Dec. 31, 1980 in South Korea. She drowned in Lake Whitney in Texas in 1986. Her family said Myeong-Hi was unable to swim and had a strong aversion to water. Bruises on Myeong-Hi’s face made her sister suspicious and she requested an autopsy. Reeves had Myeong-Hi cremated.

Fourth wife 
Reeves met his fourth wife, Emilita Villa, through a mail-order bride service when she was 18. Reeves was 28 years her senior. Emilita was reportedly reluctant to marry him, but felt obligated due to monthly payments Reeves sent to her family in the Philippines. When Emilita became pregnant, Reeves sent her back to her family as he did not believe he was the father. He changed his mind when she sent him a photograph of their son. She was last seen alive October 11, 1994. She disappeared shortly after telling friends she intended to divorce Reeves. In October 1995, her remains were found by a hunter in a shallow grave near Lake Whitney, where Reeves' third wife had drowned eight years previously.

Investigation and arrest 
Emilita's friend reported her missing. The police became suspicious when they found out Reeves had two dead wives, both of whom died after making plans to leave Reeves and after complaining to friends about being mistreated by Reeves.  He was arrested on March 21, 1995, for the murder of his second wife and his bail was set at $500,000.

Trial 
He was convicted on January 3, 1996, for the 1978 murder of Sharon Reeves and received a 35-year prison sentence. On August 20, 1996, he was convicted of murdering Emilita Reeves and sentenced to an additional 99 years. Reeves appealed against both convictions; his appeals were rejected. His sentences are being served concurrently. He will be eligible for parole in 2026.

See also 
 List of serial killers in the United States

References 

1940 births
1967 crimes in Italy
1967 murders in Italy
1978 murders in the United States
1986 murders in the United States
1994 murders in the United States
20th-century criminals
20th-century murders in the United States
American people convicted of manslaughter
American serial killers
Living people
Male serial killers
People convicted of murder by Texas
People from Wichita Falls, Texas
Uxoricides